Tutoh, also known as Long Wat, is a Kenyah language of Sarawak, Malaysia, spoken along the Tutoh River.
It is spoken in the villages of Long Wat and in the Bornean city of Miri, where however most are shifting to Malay.

External links

Languages of Malaysia
Kenyah languages